Blonde Trouble is a 1937 American musical comedy film directed by George Archainbaud and starring Eleanore Whitney, Johnny Downs and Lynne Overman. Produced and distributed by Paramount Pictures, it is based on the plot of the 1929 musical June Moon by George S. Kaufman and Ring Lardner

Synopsis
Fred Stevens is an aspiring songwriter from Schenectady who journeys to New York City, hoping to make a name for himself.  On the train he meets dental assistant Edna Baker, and the two embark upon a friendship that evolves into her falling for him.  While struggling in Tin Pan Alley, Fred falls in with his composer partner's gold-digging sister-in-law Eileen.  Eileen really becomes interested when she finds out Fred is carrying his life savings.

Cast 
 Eleanore Whitney as Edna Baker
 Johnny Downs as Fred Stevens
 Lynne Overman as Joe Hart
 Terry Walker as Eileen Fletcher
 Benny Baker as Maxie Schwartz
 William Demarest as Paul Sears
 John Patterson as Danny Fox
 El Brendel as Window Washer
 Barlowe Borland as Goebel
 Kitty McHugh as Goldie Foster
 Helen Flint as Lucille Sears
 Harvey Clark as Waiter
 Mabel Colcord as Landlady
 Spec O'Donnell as Fred's Friend

References

Bibliography
 Hischak, Thomas H. The Oxford Companion to the American Musical: Theatre, Film, and Television. Oxford University Press, 2008.

External links 
 

1937 films
Films directed by George Archainbaud
Paramount Pictures films
1937 musical comedy films
American musical comedy films
American black-and-white films
1930s American films